Irin or IRIN may refer to:

 Irin, Iran, a village in Tehran Province
 Integrated Regional Information Networks, now The New Humanitarian, an independent, non-profit news agency
 Islamic Republic of Iran Navy
 Watcher (angel), Aramaic irin in the Books of Enoch